Daisy Siete is a Philippine television drama anthology broadcast by GMA Network. Starring the SexBomb Girls, it premiered on September 1, 2003 on the network's Dramarama sa Hapon line up. The show concluded on July 2, 2010 with a total of 26 seasons. It was replaced by Ang Yaman ni Lola in its timeslot.

Cast
 Rochelle Pangilinan
 Jopay
 Sunshine Garcia
 Mia Pangyarihan

Seasons
Seasons 1 to 6 were weekly episodes, where the story is not continuous.

Ratings
According to AGB Nielsen Philippines' Mega Manila People ratings, the final episode of Daisy Siete scored a 5.2% rating.

Accolades

References

External links
 

2003 Philippine television series debuts
2010 Philippine television series endings
Filipino-language television shows
GMA Network original programming
Philippine anthology television series
Television series by TAPE Inc.
Television shows set in the Philippines